Harder ... Faster is the eighth studio album by Canadian rock band April Wine, released in 1979. The album would be certified gold in the US and Canada by the Canadian Recording Industry Association and RIAA. The album spawned the hits "I Like to Rock" and "Say Hello". A cover of King Crimson's "21st Century Schizoid Man" is also on the album. The track "I Like to Rock" is one of the band's most recognized popular songs.

The popularity of these songs helped keep the album on Billboard’s 200 Album charts for a span of 40 weeks.

Track listing
All tracks written by Myles Goodwyn unless otherwise noted.
 "I Like to Rock" – 4:23
 "Say Hello" – 2:59
 "Tonite" – 4:12
 "Ladies Man" – 3:36
 "Before the Dawn" (B. Greenway) – 4:21
 "Babes in Arms" – 3:21
 "Better Do It Well" (M. Goodwyn, G. Moffet) – 3:34
 "21st Century Schizoid Man" (R. Fripp, M. Giles, G. Lake, I. McDonald, P. Sinfield) – 6:24

Personnel

April Wine 
Myles Goodwyn – vocals, guitars
 Brian Greenway – vocals, guitars
 Gary Moffet – guitars, background vocals
 Steve Lang – bass, background vocals
 Jerry Mercer – drums

References

1979 albums
April Wine albums
Aquarius Records (Canada) albums
Capitol Records albums
Albums produced by Myles Goodwyn
Albums produced by Nick Blagona
Albums recorded at Le Studio